IX Corps was a corps-sized formation of the British Army that existed during the First and the Second World Wars.

First World War
The IX Corps was originally formed in England in 1915 in readiness to make a new landing at Suvla during the Battle of Gallipoli. Headquarters was formed at the Tower of London Command of the corps was given to Lieutenant-General Sir Frederick Stopford.  His handling of the corps during the August Offensive warranted his replacement after only 9 days with Lieutenant-General Julian Byng.

During the Gallipoli campaign the corps comprised the following divisions:
 10th (Irish) Division
 11th (Northern) Division
 13th (Western) Division
 53rd (Welsh) Division
 54th (East Anglian) Division
 2nd Mounted Division
 IX Corps Signals was provided by London District Signals, Royal Engineers

Following the British evacuation of Gallipoli, the corps was moved to France in 1916, where it was commanded by Alexander Hamilton-Gordon until he was relieved in 1918.

In April 1918 the corps was allotted those divisions which had seen particularly heavy casualties in the fighting during the First Battle of the Somme (1918) and the Battle of the Lys, these were:-
8th Division
19th (Western) Division
21st Division
25th Division
50th (Northumbrian) Division

These divisions were moved south to a quiet sector to reform. This sector was the unlucky target of the next German offensive, the Third Battle of the Aisne in May–June 1918, causing further losses to IX Corps. General Duchêne, commander of the French Sixth Army, had deployed IX corps (five divisions) too far forward, on the Chemin des Dames ridge which had been gained at such cost in the Second Battle of the Aisne the previous year.  (The French Commander-in-Chief Petain and the Army Group Commander Franchet d’Esperey would have preferred the ridge to be lightly held and the main defence to be a battle zone between it and the River Aisne).

In September 1918 the following divisions joined the Corps:

6th Infantry Division
At the time of the Armistice the IX Corps was part of the Fourth Army.

Second World War
Disbanded in 1919 after the First World War ended, IX Corps was reformed during the Second World War in the United Kingdom in April 1941, under the command of Lieutenant-General Ridley P. Pakenham-Walsh. The 59th (Staffordshire) Infantry Division and the Durham and North Riding County Division transferred to IX Corps from X Corps on 9 April 1941, which suggests this is the date the IX Corps became effective. The Northumberland County Division joined IX Corps the following day.

The 15th (Scottish) Infantry Division transferred to join the corps, now commanded by Lieutenant-General Edwin L. Morris, on 21 November 1941. On 30 November, both of the county divisions were disbanded, and on the following day, 1 December 1941, the corps was redesignated as IX Corps District. The 15th Division left the IX Corps District on 28 September 1942, to transfer to Northumbrian District, suggesting the corps temporarily ceased to be operational on this date.

The IX Corps, now commanded by Lieutenant-General John T. Crocker, was deployed to fight in North Africa under the command of Lieutenant-General Kenneth A. N. Anderson's British First Army. The IX Corps headquarters, with Brigadier Gordon H. A. MacMillan as its chief of staff, landed in and opened as the reserve for the Allied 18th Army Group on 24 March 1943. The 6th Armoured Division transferred to the corps from Lieutenant-General Charles W. Allfrey's V Corps on 12 March 1943. The corps also took command of the U.S. 34th Infantry Division and the 128th Infantry Brigade Group, part of the 46th Infantry Division, and commenced an attack on Pinchon-Fondouk on the southern flank of the First Army.

For the final offensive in North Africa several veteran formations from General Sir Bernard Montgomery's British Eighth Army arrived to reinforce the IX Corps, which was to play a leading role in the forthcoming offensive to end the war in North Africa. The British 7th Armoured Division, from the British Eighth Army, joined IX Corps on 30 April. The 4th Indian Infantry Division, also from the Eighth Army, joined on 30 April, followed by the 201st Guards Brigade, with the British 4th Infantry Division joining on 3 May. This gave IX Corps, now commanded by Lieutenant-General Brian G. Horrocks (replacing Crocker who had been injured by a PIAT in a training incident), two armoured divisions and two infantry divisions. The final assault commenced on 5 May with the two infantry divisions forcing the Medjez-el-Bab gap, through which the two armoured divisions passed through to bring about the eventual surrender of the Axis forces on 13 May 1943.

With the surrender of almost 250,000 Axis soldiers in North Africa, the IX Corps was run down. The 7th Armoured Division transferred to V Corps on 18 May 1943, the British 4th Infantry Division following it four days later, and the 6th Armoured Division (with the attached 201st Guards Brigade) on 26 May. IX Corps, with no commander after Horrocks returned to X Corps and as Crocker was still injured, was disbanded on 31 May 1943.

General Officers Commanding
First World War commanders included:

 Lieutenant-General Sir Frederick Stopford (17 June 1915–16 August 1915)
 Major-General Beauvoir De Lisle (temporary) (16–24 August 1915)
 Lieutenant-General Sir Julian Byng (24 August 1915 – 8 February 1916)
 Lieutenant-General Sir Francis Davies (8 February – 20 June 1916)
 Lieutenant-General Alexander Hamilton-Gordon (20 June 1916 – 16 July 1918)
 Major-General Sir Robert Whigham (temporary) (16 July – 22 July 1918)
 Major-General Harold Higginson (temporary) (22 July – 30 July 1918)
 Lieutenant-General Sir Alexander Hamilton-Gordon (30 July – 10 September 1918)
 Major-General Peter Strickland (temporary) (10 September – 13 September 1918)
 Lieutenant-General Walter Braithwaite (from 13 September 1918)

Second World War commanders included:

 Lieutenant-General Ridley Pakenham-Walsh (7 June 1941 – 17 November 1941)
 Lieutenant-General Edwin Morris (18 November 1941 – 31 January 1942)
 Lieutenant-General Francis Nosworthy (1 February 1942–11 September 1942)
 Lieutenant-General John Crocker (12 September 1942 – 29 April 1943)
 Lieutenant-General Brian Horrocks (29 April 1943–3 June 1943)

Notes

References
 Maj A.F. Becke, History of the Great War: Order of Battle of Divisions, Part 4: The Army Council, GHQs, Armies, and Corps 1914–1918, London: HM Stationery Office, 1944/Uckfield: Naval & Military Press, 2007, .

 Cliff Lord & Graham Watson, Royal Corps of Signals: Unit Histories of the Corps (1920–2001) and its Antecedents, Solihull: Helion, 2003, .
 Harris, J.P. Douglas Haig and the First World War. Cambridge, Cambridge University Press, 2008. 
 JPS Cigarette card series, Army, Corps and Divisional Signs 1914–1918, John Player and sons, 1920s.

Online sources
 Army Commands at Colin Mackie's website
 British Military History
 First World War Biographies
 Liddell Hart Centre for Military Archives
 The Long, Long Trail
 Royal Munster Fusiliers website

British field corps
Corps of the British Army in World War I
Corps of the British Army in World War II
Military units and formations of the British Empire in World War II